Arthur Allman  (24 December 1890 – 22 December 1956) was an English footballer. His regular position was at full back. He was born in Milton, Staffordshire. He played for Manchester United, Shrewsbury Town, Wolverhampton Wanderers (though never in a first team fixture), Swansea Town, Stoke (as a guest during the First World War), and Millwall Athletic.

Career statistics
Source:

References

External links
MUFCInfo.com profile

1890 births
1956 deaths
English footballers
Manchester United F.C. players
Shrewsbury Town F.C. players
Wolverhampton Wanderers F.C. players
Swansea City A.F.C. players
Stoke City F.C. wartime guest players
Millwall F.C. players
English Football League players
Association football fullbacks
Aberaman Athletic F.C. players
Crewe Alexandra F.C. players